Sarah Waukau is a former member of the Wisconsin State Assembly.

Biography
Waukau was born on April 3, 1947, in Antigo, Wisconsin. She would graduate from the University of Wisconsin-Eau Claire. Waukau is a widow with two children.

Career
Waukau was elected to the Assembly in 1999 in a special election following the resignation of Thomas D. Ourada. She was a member of the Antigo City Council from 1990 to 1992 and again from 1995 to 1999. Waukau is a Democrat.

References

People from Antigo, Wisconsin
Democratic Party members of the Wisconsin State Assembly
Wisconsin city council members
Women state legislators in Wisconsin
University of Wisconsin–Eau Claire alumni
1947 births
Living people
Women city councillors in Wisconsin
21st-century American women